Behold, a Pale Horse is the second album by English singer Ebony Bones, an alias of Ebony Thomas. The album was released on 5 August 2013 through 1984 Recordings and Sunday Best Recordings.

Background
In 2013, Bones released her second album Behold, A Pale Horse: it was partly conceived while travelling in India. The record featured the Symphony Orchestra of India and a cover of The Smiths'  What Difference Does It Make?.  Behold, A Pale Horse was critically acclaimed and received good reviews by the likes of The Independent and Spin.

Singles
"I See I Say" was released on 30 June 2013 as the lead single from the album.

"Neu World Blues" was released in July 2013 as the second single from the album.

Track listing

References

Ebony Bones albums
2013 albums